Fish Creek Dam in Blaine County, Idaho is an aging multiple-arch concrete dam that has achieved historic status and now represents some threat to public safety, due to danger of it failing.  It is listed on the National Register of Historic Places.

It is a 92-foot-high concrete dam that is 1,700 feet long, blocking Fish Creek in the lower ranges of the Pioneer Mountains. Located 11 miles northeast of Carey, Idaho, the dam was completed in 1923.  It was a work of John S. Eastwood.

The dam was listed on the National Register in 1978;  the listing included just the one contributing structure on a  area.

In 2007, it was identified as one of the four highest-hazard dams in Idaho, having significant threat to human lives if it were to fail.

References

Industrial buildings and structures on the National Register of Historic Places in Idaho
Industrial buildings completed in 1923
Buildings and structures in Blaine County, Idaho
Dams in Idaho
National Register of Historic Places in Blaine County, Idaho